Burrville may refer to:
Burrville (Torrington), a community of Torrington, Connecticut
Burrville, a hamlet near Watertown, New York
Burrville, Utah, an unincorporated community in Sevier County, Utah
Burrville (Washington, D.C.), a neighborhood of Washington, D.C.